Arthur Lavine (December 20, 1922 - June 27, 2016) was an American mid-century photojournalist and magazine photographer who, among other achievements, produced significant documentation of New Caledonia during World War 2.

Early life
Arthur Eli ('Art') Lavine was born December 20, 1922, in Trenton, N.J., the son of Barney and Helen Lavine, and brother of younger sister Audrey, an artist, who died in 1982.

Lavine's first ambition was to become a cinematographer. He had started photographing wth a box camera when he was eleven years old, and given a movie camera at age thirteen, he "used it to make home movies with titles like, 'War' and 'Murder'" and in 1939 travelled daily from his home by train to film the World's Fair in Flushing Meadows, which he edited into an hour-long film. He was president of the movie club in high school. However, since no undergraduate courses were available in movie-making, he instead studied drama at the University of North Carolina in Chapel Hill.

WW2 and New Caledonia 
In early 1942 when the United States had already entered World War II,  Lavine, then a 19-year-old student, received notice to report for military duty, delaying his graduation. He was first assigned to the air corps to learn radio code, but his parents arranged to have him transferred to the army signal corps where he was sent to Astoria, N.Y., to become a darkroom technician.

In April 1944 he was sent to New Caledonia, where he worked at a photo lab in Nouméa. In order to become an official army photographer he was sent to Guadalcanal, in the Solomon Islands, for three months. On return to Nouméa, he was made supervisor of the photo laboratory serving in the rank of Corporal as a non-combatant photographer. Lavine documented the lives of New Caledonians, including the Kanak community, focussing mainly on family groups and children, all pictured during casual encounters in village environments.

His imagery, and that of his amateur colleague Corporal Elmer Williams, was a record of a tumultuous and difficult period of change in the archipelago that also brought the PX, Cuban cigars, ice-cream, refrigerators, sophisticated medical care, liquor, Jeeps, and jazz. Williams' work had been exhibited in late 2006 at the Tjibaou Cultural Centre curated from the Archives of New Caledonia by Dr Prue Ahrens of the University of Queensland, then touring Australia and then the United States, starting in San Diego. There, Arthur Lavine learned of the event through a friend and went to the opening with his own wartime photographs, which have since attracted scholarly interest.

After the War he studied with Clarence White Jr. in Maine, during which time he made his best-known photograph, Working Hands, Bath, Maine, 1947.

New York
In 1948 Lavine moved into his first apartment at Third Avenue and 53rd Street, NYC. Keen to get work, he advanced on his wartime training by joining the workshops and classes of Lisette Model, Alexey Brodovitch, and Berenice Abbott, heeding Model's instruction “to go out in the street and photograph people, getting close and not being afraid.”

His first success was a story on the Philadelphia Zoo that he sold for a Sunday feature. By the 1950s he had "met many magazine editors and quickly started to get assignments,” then joined the Black Star agency to free-lance for more than thirty magazines including Collier's, Esquire, The New York Times Magazine, Glamour, Newsweek, Fortune, Look, Life, and Redbook, shooting much of his work in colour. In 1951 he became member and then officer of the American Society of Magazine Photographers and was a member of the ASMP San Diego Chapter.

Style and reception

Style 
Working in the humanist genre, Lavine had a talent for visually conveying the essentials of each story he illustrated, sometimes to humorous, and always to sympathetic, effect. In the 1940s he personally initiated stories on Trenton, Maine and subway passengers in New York.

Recognition 
Three exhibitions at the Museum of Modern Art featured his imagery, including Working Hands, Bath, Maine, 1947, which shows the hands and arms of two workers, sunlit and muscular, grasping the stout wooden lever to drill into a pipeline. Cropped into a tight vertical, it was selected for Edward Steichen's The Family of Man at the Museum which then toured the world and was seen by 9 million visitors.

Reception 
Recent commentator Marc-Emmanuel Mélon interprets the image as a phallic embodiment of a paternalistic trope in The Family of Man, while W. S. Di Piero calls it "a tough-minded image that fit Steichen's scheme because it depicted the necessity of collaboration and cooperation: its unambiguous import was that we're all in this—the world of work—together." Helen Gee in her autobiography, which his mid-50s pictures of her Limelight Photography Gallery and Coffeehouse in Greenwich Village illustrate, recalls Lavine's "excitement when he saw his picture...enlarged to a monumental nine feet" (it was shot on large format 5" x 4" film), and notes that when the image was prepared as a first edition issue postage stamp, that "even when tiny, it held its own".

W. S. Di Piero admires Lavine's 'innocent eye' as applied in his street photography, and writes that his "sanguine temperament embraces his subjects but doesn't squeeze the life out of them." Tamara Weintraub finds a subtle beauty in Lavine's early work, made before he had developed a recognisable style, in his New Caledonia imagery and sees "poignant connections these images draw from past to present, and between two seemingly different cultures...[that]...separates Lavine's work from the "souvenir" snapshots or official army photographs taken by other American soldiers at the time."

Legacy 

Lavine's records of the Limelight gallery and café provide a valuable historic record of a vital era in which photography was becoming collectible as an art form in America.  As well as the emerging coffee houses, in that decade Lavine's street photography and photojournalism also covered the working class districts of New York, the demolition of the elevated railway, sharecroppers in Virginia for the Newport News, and farm workers in Kansas, Dakota and Nebraska. His 1960s subjects are diverse and include the anti-Vietnam marches and construction of the World Trade Center.

Lavine attended the March 5 opening of his 2008 solo show Arthur Lavine photographe at the Musée de Nouvelle-Calédonie for which two specialists, Kathy Creely of the University of California, and Prudence Ahrens, an art historian from the University of Queensland, produced a catalogue, the first publication of the museum to be devoted to photography.

Corporate photography
Lavine reduced his freelancing in the late '50s to become a corporate staff photographer traveling, widely across America to produce in-house publications, annual reports, press releases and displays, first for four years from 1956 at Western Electric Company, and then from 1960 to 1983 he directed the Chase Manhattan Bank, photography department, which entailed much traveling in the US and abroad, and where he documented the beginnings of business computing. Lavine contributed to financial publications after retiring from Chase, and continued with personal photographic projects.

Later life
In 1992 Lavine settled in San Diego with his wife Rhoda and continued to produce and exhibit reportage, mood pieces and abstract works. Of such images shown in 2007 in Arthur Lavine: peripatetic wanderings and meditations at the Museum of Photographic Arts, Di Piero remarked; "He has always chased the stirrings of light on matter, and so in a way it's appropriate that since moving to San Diego he has made many abstract pictures about the actions of the local light."

Lavine died aged 93 on June 27, 2016 at his Rancho Bernardo home after suffering Alzheimer's disease. He was survived by his wife, two sons and three grandchildren.

An archive of his documents and imagery is held at the Museum of Modern Art, New York.

Publications

Books 
Cohn, D. L., Scroggs, R., & Lavine, A. (1941). Chapel Hill. Chapel Hill, N.C.: Dialectic and Philanthropic Literary Societies of the University of North Carolina.
U.S. Camera Annuals '46, '47, '51, '55, '59
Photography Annuals '52, '53, '54, '70, '71

 Gee, H. (1991). 'Limelight: Remembering Gene Smith'. American Art, 5(4), 10-19.
 Photographs in 

 Bera, S., Lavine, A., Indie Photobook Library/Larissa Leclair Collection (Beinecke Rare Book and Manuscript Library), & Blurb (Firm),. (2011). California cell.

Magazine photography 
Lavine contributed photographs to numbers of magazines including:

Collections
 The International Center of Photography, New York City
Art Institute of Chicago
 Museum of Fine Arts, Houston
 Bibliothèque nationale de France

Exhibitions

Solo

References

External links
 Arthur Lavine: Photographs from Seven Decades, a Retrospective at Photoarts

1922 births
2016 deaths
American photojournalists
Street photographers
Humanist photographers
United States Army personnel of World War II
Expatriates in New Caledonia